Modhi Vilayadu is a 2009 Indian Tamil-language action film directed by Saran. It stars Vinay and Kajal Aggarwal. This is the second time that Saran had worked without his usual music collaborator Bharadwaj after Alli Arjuna in 2002. Released on 24 July 2009, the film opened to mixed reviews and fared poorly at the box office. The film's plot involving the female protagonist is based on the Korean movie 100 Days with Mr. Arrogant.

Plot
Rajan Vasudev (Kalabhavan Mani) is an intolerable business tycoon who runs the great OPM Group of companies spread across the globe. He meaninglessly topples companies by either buying or taking the majority shares so that his company can spread across. His wife was killed 20 years ago by a rival company owner, which turned him into this way. Udhay Vasudev (Vinay) is his only son, a spoilt kid who drives a Ferrari, spends lakhs of rupees everyday, and lives in one of the most sophisticated houses in Chennai. He is the sponsor for his constant companion Madhan (Yuva), who lives with him and local friend Kadukku (N. Santhanam) along with 12 bodyguards (headed by Alse Ram). Udhay meets LR Easwari (Kajal Aggarwal), a music student in Chennai in an accident and falls head on for her. He wants to get close to her and blackmails her by saying that she has damaged his car and could work for him to compensate the 10 lakh she owes him, and in a funny turn of events, he makes her his domestic help. Soon, Madhan falls in love with Easwari, who has also fallen for Udhay.

An assassin is hired by Rajan's rival, whose son-in-law commits suicide due to Rajan's pressure, to knock off Udhay, the only heir to the business empire. But in a bizarre twist, the killer accidentally kills Madhan, and Rajan is heartbroken as it is revealed that Madhan is his real son whereas Udhay was just a proxy for Madhan. Udhay, who does not know this, spends a lot. Suddenly he is thrown out of his house, and his bank account is swiped clean by OPM company. Multiple assassination attempts are made upon him, and he meets Rajan in rags. Rajan reveals the truth to him and challenges him to live for 30 days as he won't reveal the truth to anyone else. Udhay ends up on the streets overnight as he is not needed any longer. Udhay then goes to Mumbai to meet Easwari, who turns out to be the daughter of the chairman of the very rich Lakshmiraman (Raviprakash). Though Easwari has enough shares to become the next chairwoman, her stepmother's relatives refuse her because both of her parents are not Hindi-speaking by birth. Easwari denounces her claim and heads back to Chennai with a shocked Udhay. Udhay then decides to teach his father a lesson. He convinces all of his father's daily staff to act as if they had forgotten him for two days. As a result, Rajan is refused entry into his own office where none of his staff recognises him and his personal belongings are stolen. He is down to rags and has to sleep on the streets. The next day, he tries to complain to the police, but sees another person's face in his name under his company's posters. He is then arrested by the police under false accusation but is released the next day. He is recognized by everyone and returns to his office.

There, in his absence, Udhay has assumed office as acting chairman and has called for general body meeting the next day to officially confirm him as the next chairman. Udhay blackmails Rajan that if he reveals the truth about his son to public, Udhay will immediately resign from office and get out of Rajan's sight. Rajan seemingly agrees. An assassin is sent to kill Udhay in the GBM, as the world still believes that he is Rajan's son. Rajan deceives Udhay, claims he is his son, and says he is proud of him. The assassin attempts to shoot Udhay, but shoots Rajan. Udhay chases the killer and gets him to the police. When he returns, Rajan is dead. Udhay is down to tears as the world will never know the truth, is surprised to see a dying Rajan tell the truth to public in a video. Udhay, with the help of Chanakya (Cochin Haneefa), gets back his wealth.

Cast
Vinay as Udhay Vasudev
Kajal Aggarwal as Easwari Lakshmiram
Kalabhavan Mani as Rajan Vasudev
Cochin Haneefa as Chanakya
Santhanam as Kadukku
Yuva as Madhan
Amit Dhawan as Iqbal
Alse Ram as Alse
Raviprakash as Lakshmiram
Mayilsamy as T. M. Sekhar
Mahadevan as Madhan's uncle

Music 
The film has music of Hariharan - Lesle Lewis for the first time in Tamil. The audio launch of this movie was held on 28 April.

Reception
The film opened to mixed reviews with Indiaglitz.com rating it highly while Behindwoods said "The game lacks excitement".

References

External links
 

2009 films
2000s Tamil-language films
Films directed by Saran
Indian remakes of South Korean films